Marcos Francisco Dueñas Jimeno (born 9 April 1978 in Granada) is a paralympic athlete from Spain competing mainly in category T44 sprint events.

Marcos was part of the Spanish team that travelled to the 1996 Summer Paralympics in Atlanta where he competed in the 100m, 200m and long jump.  He was also part of the team that travelled to Sydney for the 2000 Summer Paralympics again competing in the 100m and 200m as well as the 4 × 100 m and part of the Spanish silver medal-winning 4 × 400 m T46 relay team.

References

External links
 
 
 

1978 births
Living people
Spanish male sprinters
Spanish male long jumpers
Paralympic athletes of Spain
Paralympic silver medalists for Spain
Paralympic medalists in athletics (track and field)
Athletes (track and field) at the 1996 Summer Paralympics
Athletes (track and field) at the 2000 Summer Paralympics
Medalists at the 2000 Summer Paralympics
Sprinters with limb difference
Long jumpers with limb difference
Paralympic sprinters
Paralympic long jumpers